The Greek women's Basketball League, also known as A1 Ethniki (A1 National) Women's Basketball is the most important competition of Greek women's professional basketball. It is organised by the EOK (Hellenic Basketball Federation). It began with the 1967–68 season. The first championship of the league, which was held in the 1967–68 season, was organised by ΕΟΑΠ (Greek: Ελληνική Ομοσπονδία Αθλοπαιδιών). Two years later, the EOK assumed control of the competition.

Iraklis Thessaloniki won the inaugural championship of the league, in the 1967–68 season. From 1976 to 1999, Sporting Athens dominated the competition, winning 20 championships in that period (they also won another championship in 2004). So far, Sporting has won the most league championships (21 in total). From 2008 to 2012, Athinaikos dominated exclusively, breaking the record of consecutive wins in the Greek Women's League. The successes of Olympiacos were entered into the Guinness book of records. Theconsecutive win streak of Olympiacos was finally halted at 117 wins. The current champion of the league is Olympiacos, which has won six league championships.

History
The Greek Women's Basketball League competition started in 1968. In the 1984–85 season, the competition was renamed to A National, and in the 1997–98 season, it was renamed to A1 National. Simultaneously, the second division was created under the name A2 National. In 2010, the organisers of the league championship decided to add playoff rounds to the competition.

Current teams

The clubs for the 2019–20 season:

Titles holders

 1967–68 Iraklis Thessaloniki
 1968–69 Peiraikos
 1969–70 Peiraikos
 1970–71 Iraklis Thessaloniki
 1971–72 Iraklis Thessaloniki 
 1972–73 Athens College 
 1973–74 Apollon Kalamarias
 1974–75 Palaio Faliro 
 1975–76 Sporting Athens
 1976–77 Sporting Athens
 1977–78 Olympiacos Volou
 1978–79 Sporting Athens
 1979–80 Sporting Athens
 1980–81 Sporting Athens
 1981–82 Palaio Faliro
 1982–83 Sporting Athens
 1983–84 Sporting Athens
 1984–85 Sporting Athens
 1985–86 Sporting Athens
 1986–87 Sporting Athens
 1987–88 Sporting Athens
 1988–89 Sporting Athens
 1989–90 Sporting Athens
 1990–91 Sporting Athens
 1991–92 Apollon Kalamarias
 1992–93 Sporting Athens
 1993–94 Sporting Athens
 1994–95 Sporting Athens
 1995–96 Sporting Athens
 1996–97 Sporting Athens
 1997–98 Panathinaikos
 1998–99 Sporting Athens
 1999–00 Panathinaikos
 2000–01 Ano Liosia
 2001–02 Ano Liosia
 2002–03 Ano Liosia
 2003–04 Sporting Athens
 2004–05 Panathinaikos
 2005–06 Esperides Kallitheas
 2006–07 Panionios
 2007–08 Esperides Kallitheas
 2008–09 Athinaikos
 2009–10 Athinaikos
 2010–11 Athinaikos
 2011–12 Athinaikos
 2012–13 Panathinaikos
 2013–14 Elliniko-Sourmena
 2014–15 Elliniko-Sourmena
 2015–16 Olympiacos
 2016–17 Olympiacos
 2017–18 Olympiacos
 2018–19 Olympiacos
 2019–20 Olympiacos
 2020–21 Panathinaikos
 2021–22 Olympiacos

Performance by club

Sponsors and supporters
 Spalding
 Aegean Airlines

References

External links
Hellenic Basketball Federation 
Greek Women's Basketball League at basket.gr 
Eurobasket.com, Greek Basketball (Women)

Women's basketball competitions in Greece
Sports leagues established in 1967
Basketball leagues in Greece
1967 establishments in Greece
Basketball
Professional sports leagues in Greece